Westfield Knox (formerly known as Knox City Shopping Centre) is a shopping centre, outdoor entertainment and professional services complex in the outer eastern Melbourne suburb of Wantirna South, in the Australian state of Victoria. The centre opened on 9 November 1977 with 88 stores and 2300 parking spaces.

There are over 350 stores and over 6300 free car parking spaces, making the centre the third-largest in Australia, and Scentre Group's second-largest centre in Victoria in terms of gross leasable area, behind Westfield Fountain Gate. There is also a seven-floor office tower at the southern side of the centre, as well as low-rise offices dotting the O-Zone precinct, an indoor food court, and an outdoor restaurant strip mall. In October 2012, the Westfield Group acquired AMP's share of the centre and was subsequently rebranded as Westfield Knox.

History 

Planning for the development of the shopping centre commenced in 1972 when McIntyre, McIntyre and Partners Pty. Ltd. won a $30 million tender from the AMP Society to design the new complex in Wantirna South. Their successful design led to the construction of a Brutalist style building. Architect Peter McIntyre was given the Buildings Award Medal by the Victorian Chapter of the Royal Australian Institute of Architects in 1978 for the design of Knox City Shopping Centre.

Construction commenced in 1975 when the shopping centre was originally going to be named "Studwood Shopping Centre", however this name was later abandoned. The shopping centre was officially opened on 9 November 1977. The centre originally included a three-storey Myer department store, a twin Dendy Cinemas complex, public library, Target discount department store, Target supermarket, McEwans hardware and 83 speciality shops. A seven-story high office tower was constructed on the south side of the building at the same time.

Throughout 1989 and 1990, the centre was doubled in size and the original section completely refurbished. A fourth floor was added to the Myer store, the undercover car parks were expanded and new promenade, market and food court areas were added. The Target supermarket was removed and new Coles and Bi-Lo supermarkets opened. Target was also expanded in size. Venture also opened on level two where Toys "R" Us resided The twin cinemas were replaced with a 10-screen Village Cinemas complex, which opened in 1988 (replaced in 2002 and now unused above JB Hi-Fi). On the adjacent block an outdoor shopping centre was established, known as the Knox District Centre (later Knox Towerpoint and now Knox O-Zone).

During 1997, the centre saw a minor refurbishment. An updated logo was introduced, along with new signage to complement. The food court was remodelled and introduced food decorations on the walls above the food outlets, palm trees, new tables and chairs as well as the opening of Hungry Jack's. Lincraft was also relocated when McEwans closed down. However, it, itself has closed down to make way for a new Harris Scarfe in October 2009. Best & Less moved into Lincraft's old retail space. The Reject Shop also moved from opposite Coles to The Market area.

In 2002, the centre was extended further at a cost of $150 million. The Knox Towerpoint complex was renamed Knox O-Zone and joined to Knox City Shopping Centre through an expansion of the shopping centre eastwards and redevelopment of the O-Zone shops. The eastern section of the centre was completely redeveloped, which opened on 17 October 2002 with the new Knox O-Zone opening on 31 October. The exterior of the existing shopping centre was also painted. Currently there are over 350 retailers throughout the complex and 6,391 car parking spaces available.

In October 2012, Westfield Group purchased the centre, adding it to their franchise. As of July 2014, the Westfield Group became two companies Scentre Group and Westfield Corporation. The Westfield Group portion is now owned by Scentre Group.

Planned Expansion
In October 2014, an application to expand the centre was approved by the Knox City Council. The plan included a $450 million expansion southward from 142,500 m2 to 188,500 m2, becoming the second largest centre in Australia, only behind Chadstone. Beginning by 2016 and opening in stages from 2017, the project was intended to include an international retail and fashion precinct, a new cafe area and the relocation of a discount department store further towards the Burwood Hwy frontage to accommodate for new corridors. Secondary refurbishments and upgrades to the Ozone precinct were also intended to commence in 2015, including the relocation of the bus interchange and library into this area, east of their present locations. Approximately 2650 additional parking spaces from new multi-deck car parks would also be available.

However, as of September 2017, there had been no expansion of the shopping center, with no word of when construction would begin. The permit to expand Westfield Knox was set to expire in November 2017, unless an extension was granted. The longer the expansion was put off, the more urgent it become, as many of the stores and foyers had started to look tired, dull and dated, with public opinion of the center turning negative due to its general atmosphere and appearance. In particular, the former Myer store was in a poor state, with carpet wearing out, floor tiles missing, paint peeling, and shelves damaged. The second Coles supermarket (formerly BI-LO) had suffered lighting issues on occasions in the last years; Coles and Myer were likely waiting for the redevelopment before improving the state of their stores to improve. 

In December 2019, new plans to refurbish Westfield Knox were released after their original building permit from Knox City Council expired. The updated plans showed a smaller Myer with two floors and a casual dining precinct with an outdoor children's play area. Stewart White of Scentre Group - who lodged plans on behalf of Westfield and is the group's development and strategic asset management director - said that the updated plans included a fresh food, fashion, and casual dining precinct. He also said that the library would be relocated into Knox Ozone while not revealing a specific location. Knox will introduce retail partners and dedicated office space in retail space that used to belong to Myer. 

Myer revealed in March 2021 that they would close down their Knox store by the end of July that year, leading to speculation of what would take its place.  Days later, it was revealed that Woolworths would take over the ground floor of the former Myer space, with a new 2000sqm Knox Library taking up Levels 3 and 4.

In December 2022, Westfield officially opened level 1 of their new expansion area with Woolworths, Aldi, and the new Dining Hall. Westfield has stated that other parts of the upgrade will be released throughout 2023, including the new Library, Level 2 of the expansion area, the Basketball Court, the Swim School, and the new mini-major retailers in the old food court area. Westfield has also stated that they will be adding Macpac into the center, as well as relocating JB Hi-Fi and Rebel Sport.

Transport
Westfield Knox provides parking for around 6300 vehicles and is serviced by 11 bus routes and taxis.

Filming 
The mall has been utilised as a filming location a number of times in recent years for the Australian television soap, Neighbours, particularly the Village Cinemas entrance. It was also used in the comic show full frontal in season 2 mainly using the entrance of Village Cinemas.

References

External links
 
 Scentre Group - Knox

Westfield Group
Shopping centres in Melbourne
Shopping malls established in 1977
Buildings and structures in the City of Knox
1977 establishments in Australia